Kunturiri (Aymara kunturi condor, -(i)ri a suffix, Hispanicized spelling Condoriri) is a  mountain in the Potosí mountain range in the Bolivian Andes. It is situated south-east of Potosí in the Potosí Department, José María Linares Province, in the west of the Puna Municipality. Kunturiri lies south of the mountain Jatun Kunturiri and west of the lake T'ala Qucha.

References 

Mountains of Potosí Department